Polack is a derogatory reference to a person of Polish descent.

Polack may also refer to:
 Polack (surname)
 Polatsk, or Połack, a city in Belarus

See also 
 
 Pollack (disambiguation)
 Pollock (disambiguation)
 Polák